John Coates (born 23 March 1944) is an Australian retired politician. Born in Melbourne, he was educated at the University of Sydney, after which he became a biochemist at the University of Tasmania. In 1972, he was elected to the Australian House of Representatives as the Labor member for Denison, defeating sitting Liberal MP Robert Solomon. He was defeated by Liberal candidate Michael Hodgman in 1975, but in 1980 returned to politics when he was elected to the Senate. He remained a Senator until he resigned his place on 20 August 1996, six months after the federal election that had removed Labor from power.

Coates announced his resignation from the Senate on 20 August 1996, the same day that his ALP colleague Senator Mal Colston left the party and with Coalition support was elected Deputy President of the Senate. Senator Coates announced his resignation in the Senate just shortly after Colston's election as Deputy Senate President and when Senator Coates made this announcement there was an interjection from across the chamber from Liberal Senator Alan Ferguson. In reference to the Colston defection earlier in the day, Senator Ferguson in response to Senator Coates' announcement said "Another one." Whilst still in the middle of making his resignation speech, Senator Coates responded in kind by saying, "From the Senate not from the Australian Labor Party."

References

 

Australian Labor Party members of the Parliament of Australia
Members of the Australian Senate for Tasmania
Members of the Australian Senate
Members of the Australian House of Representatives for Denison
Members of the Australian House of Representatives
1944 births
Living people
Australian biochemists
20th-century Australian politicians